Maksim Petrovich Chernokozov (born 16 May 1985) is a former Russian professional football player.

Club career
He made his debut for FC Rostov on 13 July 2005 in the Russian Cup game against FC Luch-Energiya Vladivostok.

External links
 

1985 births
Sportspeople from Rostov-on-Don
Living people
Russian footballers
Association football defenders
FC Rostov players
FC SKA Rostov-on-Don players
FC Taganrog players